St. Morgan is an unincorporated community in Madison County, Illinois, United States.

History
St. Morgan was named for its founder and first postmaster, E. M. Morgan.

References

Unincorporated communities in Madison County, Illinois
Unincorporated communities in Illinois